Deirdre Purcell (1945 – 13 February 2023) was an Irish author, actress, and journalist.

Early life and career
Deirdre Purcell was born in 1945 in Dublin, where she was also raised. She was educated at Gortnor Abbey in County Mayo.

An Abbey Theatre actress, she played as Christine opposite Donal McCann in Drama at Inish, Miss Frost in the stage adaptation of The Ginger Man, and Pegeen Mike in The Playboy of the Western World. Purcell was also a television and press journalist. 

Purcell published twelve critically acclaimed novels, including "Pearl and The Winter Gathering", all of which have been bestsellers in Ireland. She was appointed to the board of the Central Bank of Ireland in 2003 and was serving in 2008 when the Irish banking system collapsed.

From October 2009, she presented All About the Music on RTÉ Lyric FM. She was also a presenter of "It Says in the Papers" on Morning Ireland on RTÉ Radio 1.

Purcell was awarded The Benson & Hedges and Cross awards for journalism.

Personal life and death
Purcell lived in Beara Peninsula in West Cork with her husband, and had two sons. She died on 13 February 2023, at the age of 77.

Selected works

Novels
 
 
 
 
 
 
 
 
 
 
 
 
 
 
 
 The secret (2006)
 Somewhere in Between (2007)
 Days We Remember (2008)

Series contributed to
 Finbar's Hotel (1999) (with Maeve Binchy, Dermot Bolger, Clare Boylan, Emma Donoghue, Anne Haverty, Kate O'Riordan)
 Ladies' Night at Finbar's Hotel (2000) (with Maeve Binchy, Dermot Bolger, Clare Boylan, Emma Donoghue, Anne Haverty, Kate O'Riordan)

Non-fiction

References

1945 births
2023 deaths
Irish women radio presenters
RTÉ lyric fm presenters
20th-century Irish novelists
21st-century Irish novelists
20th-century Irish women writers
21st-century Irish women writers
People educated at Gortnor Abbey
Writers from Dublin (city)